The Our Lady of Mount Carmel Cathedral Also Cartago Cathedral is a Catholic cathedral, located in the corner of the fifth Street with fourteen street, two blocks from the Park of Bolivar, in the city of Cartago (Valle del Cauca), Colombia. What stands out most of the cathedral, is that its tower is separated twenty meters from the rest of the church. It is of neoclassical style, replica of the Basilica of St. Peter of Rome.

Built initially in the middle of the fourteenth century as a chapel to honor the Virgin under the invocation of Mount Carmel. It is remembered historically for having been the site of prayer of the ragdales cartagüeños, who fervently celebrate their feast every year.

On January 22, 2012, the Cathedral housed the relic of Blessed John Paul II, a sample of his blood brought from Rome by Monsignor Slawomir Oder, as part of the meeting with victims of violence in Colombia. With this visit was fulfilled what for many believers is considered the second visit of the Holy Pope to the country since 1986.

See also
List of cathedrals in Colombia
Roman Catholicism in Colombia
Our Lady of Mount Carmel

References

Roman Catholic cathedrals in Colombia
Roman Catholic churches completed in 1944
20th-century Roman Catholic church buildings in Colombia